Colorina (English title: Redhead) is a Mexican telenovela produced by Valentín Pimstein for Televisa in 1980. It was a remake of La Colorina, while remakes of Colorina are Apasionada and Salomé.

Lucía Méndez and Enrique Álvarez Félix starred as protagonists, while José Alonso and María Teresa Rivas starred as antagonists. María Rubio, Julissa and Armando Calvo co-starred in secondary performances.

This telenovela is well remembered for its daring move to feature a cabaret dancer/prostitute as the protagonist, a decision that would lead to Televisa being forced by then-president, José López Portillo under the wishes of his mother to classify it a C rating, moving it to the 11:00 pm time slot & changing the channel in which it was shown in seeing it as "improper" to feature a prostitute as the main character on prime time television. The huge ratings success of the telenovela however, and the fact that Lucia Mendez's character doesn't remain a prostitute for long allowed for Colorina to return to Canal 2 and its original timeslot. [1] [2]

Plot 
Gustavo Adolfo Almazán is a repressed millionaire married to an invalid named Alba. His life is dictated by his tyrannical mother Ana María. One night, Iván, a rascal brother-in-law of Gustavo, brings two drunken cabaret singers, Fernanda and Rita, to the Almazán household and they start a raucous party. This is how Gustavo meets Fernanda, alias Colorina (on account of her red hair) with whom he’ll share a passionate love affair.

Ana María wants a grandchild and pays Fernanda to have a child with her son, on condition that she gives it to Alba to raise as her own. Although Fernanda initially agrees with the plan, she changes her mind after her son is born. Fernanda flees to Monterey, California where she starts a new life. Twenty years later, Fernanda is a respectable matron, the prosperous owner of a boutique. She decides to return to Mexico and introduce her biological son and two adopted sons to the Almazán family to see if they can guess which one is Gustavo Adolfo’s son.

Cast

Main 
Lucía Méndez as Fernanda Redes Paredes "Colorina"
Enrique Álvarez Félix as Gustavo Adolfo Almazán y de la Vega
Julissa as Rita
José Alonso as Iván

Recurring  

María Teresa Rivas as Ana María de la Vega de Almazán
Armando Calvo as Guillermo Almazán
María Sorté as Mirta
Alejandro Tommasi as Doménico
Liliana Abud as Alba de Almazán
María Rubio as Ami
Fernando Larrañaga as Dr. Ulloa
Luis Bayardo as Polidoro "Poli"
Héctor Ortega as Toribio
Liliana Abud as Alba de Almazán
Elizabeth Dupeyrón as Marcia Valdés de Paredes
Guillermo Capetillo as José Miguel Redes
Juan Antonio Edwards as Armando Redes
José Elías Moreno as Danilo Redes
Roxana Saucedo as Mónica Pedres Valdés
Salvador Pineda as Enrique
Alberto Inzúa as Matías
Alba Nydia Díaz as Laiza Vicuña
Arturo Lorca as Liborio
Alma Delfina as La Pingüica
Elsa Cárdenas as Adela' 
Yuri as Italia "Ita" Ferrari
Christian Bach as Peggy
Eugenio Cobo as Lic. Germán Burgos
Roberto Ballesteros as Julián Saldívar
Patricia Ancira as Lupe
Marina Dorell as Cristina
Juan Luis Galiardo as Aníbal Gallardo y Rincón
Beatriz Aguirre as Iris
Enrique Beraza as Emilio
Debbie D'Green as Bailarina
Alfredo García Márquez as Domingo
Federico Falcónas Norberto Pedres
Enrique Hidalgo as Dr. Marín
Enrique Gilabert as Detective
Óscar Bonfiglio as Enrique's friend
Marichu de Labra as Teresa
Martha Resnikoff as Dressmaker
Carlos Pouliot as Iván's friend
Myrrah Saavedra as Maid of Almazán's family

Lyrics of the song 
Colorina
con tu canto de golondrina
y ese sueño en la piel
has llenado de ti mi vida.

Colorina,
corazón de ternura escondida,
bajo tu mando de amor
llevas mi alma prendida.

Colorina...

Nuestro amor no tendrá final
porque ha echado su raíz
mas allá del bien y el mal,
porque es puro como el agua de manantial.

References

External links 

Opening of Colorina
Enrique Álvarez Félix as Gustavo
Colorina performed by Lucía Méndez
Full song Colorina by Camilo Sesto

1980 telenovelas
Mexican telenovelas
1980 Mexican television series debuts
1981 Mexican television series endings
Spanish-language telenovelas
Television shows set in Mexico
Televisa telenovelas
Obscenity controversies in television
Television controversies in Mexico